The 2009 San Luis Potosí Challenger was a professional tennis tournament played on outdoor red clay courts. It was part of the 2009 ATP Challenger Tour. It took place in San Luis Potosí, Mexico between 6 and 12 April 2009.

Singles entrants

Seeds

Rankings are as of March 23, 2009.

Other entrants
The following players received wildcards into the singles main draw:
  Luis Manuel Flores
  Mariano Puerta
  Manuel Sánchez
  Mariano Zabaleta

The following players received entry from the qualifying draw:
  Júlio César Campozano
  Juan Sebastián Cabal
  Alejandro González
  Vincent Millot

Champions

Men's singles

 Santiago Giraldo def.  Paolo Lorenzi, 6–2, 6–7(3), 6–2

Men's doubles

 Santiago González /  Horacio Zeballos def.  Franco Ferreiro /  Júlio Silva, 6–2, 7–6(5)

References
2009 Draws
Tournament Profile on ITF Tennis
ITF Search 

San Luis Potosi Challenger
Tennis tournaments in Mexico
San Luis Potosí Challenger
2009 in Mexican tennis